Rajesh Jeetah (born 5 July 1962) is the former Minister of Tertiary Education, Science, Research and Technology of Mauritius.

References

Members of the National Assembly (Mauritius)
1962 births
Living people
Government ministers of Mauritius
Place of birth missing (living people)
21st-century Mauritian people
Mauritian politicians of Indian descent